Kamuzu Kassa (born 2 September 1990) is an Ethiopian composer songwriter and producer. Kamuzu started on composing spiritual songs, but when he composed a music for Kako Getachew in 2007 he joined the secular world of music and become a public figure. Following this, Kamuzu composed music for Ethiopian artists Hamelmal Abate, Surafel Abebe, Jalud Awol and many others. Until his self-suspension in 2018, he composed more than 2000 music.

Early life 
Kamuzu was born in Beklo Segno, Wolayita, Ethiopia and raised in Wolaita Sodo. He born to the Protestant Christian parent who are health professional father and housewife mother. Kamuzu's passion for music grew in the church choir, and slowly spread to the outside. Kamuzu got his name following his father's inspiration by Hastings Kamuzu Banda's, the Prime Minister and later President of Malawi from 1964 to 1994, middle name.

In 1994, Kamuzu attended his primary school in town of  Bele (Wolaita) at Bele Primary School where is the capital of the district his hometown belongs to, but in 2000, his family left Bekilo Segno and went to Sodo. Following this, Kamuzu resumed his primary school in Ligaba Beyene Aba Sebsib primary school and he left this school when he was passed to the grade 9 and joined Sodo Comprehensive High School in 2002.

Career 
Kamuzu composed music for Eyob Deno's, local gospel singer and preacher, album which is entitled "Halo Bado", Wolaitta language, successfully in 2004. Following this, he started to compose music for non-gospel singers as well.  In 2007, he composed a single which is entitled "Aroge Arada" for Kako Getachew and this paved a way in wide for him to the secular world of music.  

In 2006, Kamuzu went to Addis Ababa and started to compose music in his own studio called "Shakura". In this studio he composed more than 2,000 songs for the beginners and most popular singers.

Works 
Kamuzu became more popular after composing "Ele Aba" for Berhanu Tezera. Next to this he successfully composed a music for Jalud Awol the song entitled Yergib amora. In 2009, he also composed a full album for Tigist Woyiso, his future wife. Also he composed more than 2,000 singles for Neway Debebe, Teddy Afro, Tibebu Workiye, Tamrat Desta, Hamelmal Abate, Abeba Dessalegn, Tadele Roba, Fikiraddis Nekatibeb, Shewandagn Hailu, Abinet Agonafer, Gosaye Tesfaye, Abush Zeleke, Hailye Tadesse, Tadele Gemechu and Bisrat Surafel in single and albums.

Awards 

Ministry of Culture and Tourism awarded him for his contribution to Ethiopian Music in 2021. Kamuzu awarded Addis Music Award's Best Composer of the Year in 2018. Also Fana Broadcasting Corporate, awarded him for his contribution to Ethiopian Music on 27 September 2021.

References 
Photos

Living people
1990 births
Ethiopian composers
Composers from Wolayita Zone
People from Wolayita Zone
People from Southern Nations, Nationalities, and Peoples' Region
Musicians from Wolayita